The Pakistan Peoples Party Parliamentarians (PPPP) is a Pakistani political party and an electoral extension of the Pakistan Peoples Party(PPP). It was created in 2002 by Amin Fahim after Pervez Musharraf's military dictatorship imposed restrictions on the PPP and its chairperson Benazir Bhutto to participate in Pakistani politics.

In January 2017, Asif Ali Zardari was elected as the President of PPPP.

See also
Pakistan Peoples Party

References

Pakistan People's Party
Political parties in Pakistan
Secularism in Pakistan
Social democratic parties in Pakistan